Omar Mohammed Ibrahim Hawsawi (born 30 July 1993) is a Saudi Arabian professional footballer who plays as a defender for Al-Sahel.

Career
Omar Mohammed started his career at Ohod in Saudi Second Division and earned promotion with Ohod from the Saudi Second Division to the Saudi First Division in the 2014–15 season. During the 2016–17 season he captained Ohod to promotion to the Saudi Professional League. On 10 July 2019, Omar Mohammed left Ohod and joined Al-Hazem following Ohod's relegation to the MS League. On 7 January 2021, Omar Mohammed joined Ohod on loan until the end of the season. On 14 August 2021, he joined Al-Kawkab. On 5 July 2022, Omar Mohammed joined Al-Sahel following Al-Kawkab's relegation.

References

External links 
 

1993 births
Living people
Saudi Arabian footballers
Ohod Club players
Al-Hazem F.C. players
Al-Kawkab FC players
Al-Sahel SC (Saudi Arabia) players
Saudi Professional League players
Saudi First Division League players
Saudi Second Division players
Association football defenders